Yacoub Masboungi (born 10 May 1948) is a Lebanese former swimmer. He competed in two events at the 1968 Summer Olympics.

References

1948 births
Living people
Lebanese male swimmers
Olympic swimmers of Lebanon
Swimmers at the 1968 Summer Olympics
Sportspeople from Beirut